Luka Pokupska   is a village in Croatia. It is connected by the D36 highway. There were 410 inhabitants in 2001.

References 

Populated places in Karlovac County